This is a summary of the Estonia women's national football team results.

Results

2013

2014

2015

2016

2017

2018

2019

2020

2021

2022

See also
List of Estonia women's international footballers

References
 Estonia women's national football team games

Results
football results